This is a list of division winners and playoff matches in the regionally organized Eccellenza 2012–2013, which is the 6th level of Italian football

Promoted teams

National play-off

Semi-Final and Final 

6
Eccellenza seasons